The Lille 1 University of Science and Technology (USTL) was a French university located on a dedicated main campus in Villeneuve d'Ascq, near Lille (Hauts-de-France - European Metropolis of Lille), with 20,000 full-time students plus 14,500 students in continuing education (2004). 1,310 permanent faculty members plus 1,200 staff and around 140 CNRS researchers work there in the different University Lille 1 institutes and 43 research labs. University Lille 1 was a member of the European Doctoral College Lille Nord de France, which produces 400 doctorate dissertations every year. The university is ranked in the world top 200 universities in mathematics by the Shanghai ranking.

University Lille 1 was established as Faculty of Science in 1854 in Lille, although its academic roots extend back to 1559. It later moved to Villeneuve d'Ascq in 1967. The University focuses on science and technology. Law, business management and medical fields are taught in the independent campus of Université de Lille II, while literature and social sciences are taught as part of the independent campus of Université de Lille III. Altogether, the three university in Lille include more than 70,000 students and are the main parts of the Community of Universities and Institutions (COMUE) Lille Nord de France.

At the beginning of 2018, the three universities (Lille 1, Lille 2, Lille 3) merged to form the University of Lille; the UFRs of Lille 1 become Departments of the new Faculty of Science and Technology.

University Lille 1 campus 
The main University Lille 1 campus, referred-to as Cité Scientifique, is located in Villeneuve d'Ascq in the suburbs of Lille, and covers an area of 1.1 km². USTL also has secondary locations in the Lille historical city centre, Sallaumines, Tourcoing and Wimereux (Marine station).

University Lille 1 is located on the same Cité Scientifique campus as École nationale supérieure de chimie de Lille and Ecole Centrale de Lille; these independent entities have established a number of joint research laboratories with USTL.

University Lille 1 faculties and doctoral college 
University Lille 1 faculties include
 UFR biology
 UFR chemistry
 UFR geography
 UFR mathematics
 UFR physics
 UFR economy and social sciences
 UFR earth sciences
 UFR electronics, electrotechnics, control and computer sciences

In addition to standard science curricula, providing bachelor (licence), master and doctorate degrees, University Lille 1 also includes a number of specialized education and research units run by the university, for undergraduate and graduate students:
 Institut d'électronique de microélectronique et de nanotechnologie (IEMN) Electronics, micro- & nano-technologies
 École polytechnique universitaire de Lille (Polytech'Lille) Engineering
 :fr:TELECOM Lille 1 Telecommunications
 :fr:IUP  Information systems for business applications
 :fr:IUP :fr:GMI Maths & information theory
 :fr:IUP Bio-technologies & Bio-industries
 :fr:IUP Génie de l'environnement – Environment management
 Institut d'Aménagement et d'Urbanisme de Lille (IAUL) Urban engineering
 Institut universitaire de technologie (IUT "A" de Lille). Undergraduate courses in a variety of technologies

University Lille 1 has also its own business management school
 Institut d'Administration des Entreprises de Lille (IAE)

University Lille 1 participates in the European Doctoral College Lille Nord-Pas de Calais, which produces 400 doctorate dissertations per year.

History 
 1559: Foundation of the University of Douai, 30 km south of Lille city centre, delivering courses in law and humanities
 1854: Establishment of the Faculty of Sciences in Lille city, reporting to University of Douai, Louis Pasteur as first dean
 1896: Transfer from the University of Douai to Lille
 1970: Creation of the independent Université des Sciences et Technologies de Lille 1 (USTL) on a new campus (Cité Scientifique) in Lille suburb
 2008: Enhanced research cooperation through Community of Universities and Institutions (COMUE) Lille Nord de France
 2018: The university merged with University of Lille II and Université Lille 3 to form the new University of Lille

Notable faculty and alumni

Faculty and staff 

Faculty and staff in alphabetical order.

 Charles Barrois (1851-1939), professor, geologist.
 Émile Borel (1871-1956), mathematician and member of parliament.
 Pierre Bourdieu (1930-2002), lecturer, sociologist.
 Joseph Boussinesq (1842-1929), professor, mathematician, fluid mechanics specialist
 Henri Cartan (1904-2008), professor, mathematician.
 Albert Châtelet (1883-1960), professor, mathematician, politician.
 Claude Dubar (1945-2015), professor, sociology.
 Robert Gabillard (1926-2012), professor, co-inventor of [Véhicule Automatique Léger]
 Joseph Kampé de Fériet (1893-1982), professor, physicist, chairman of mechanics from 1930 to 1969.
 Henri de Lacaze-Duthiers (1821-1901), professor, anatomiste, biologist, zoologist.
 Claude Auguste Lamy (1820-1878), professor, chemist, discoverer of the element thallium.
 Szolem Mandelbrojt (1899-1983), professor, mathematician.
 Louis Pasteur (1822-1895), professor, chemist and microbiologist, first dean of the science faculty.
 Paul Painlevé (1863-1933), professor, mathematician.
 Henri Padé (1863-1953), professor, mathematician.
 Ernest Vessiot (1865-1952), professor, mathematician.

Alumni 

Alumni in alphabetical order. This list includes alumni who are also faculty.

 Charles Barrois (1851-1939), professor, geologist.
 Louis Chauvel (1967-), professor, sociologist.
 Marc-Philippe Daubresse (1953-), mayor, member of parliament, French Minister for Youth and Active Solidarities.
 Louis Dollo (1857-1931), paleontologist
 Marc Drillech, sociologist and President of universities.
 Jean Théodore Delacour (1890-1985), doctor, ornithologist.
 Jean Hélion (1904-1987), painter.
 Jacky Hénin (1960-), politician.
 Vladimir Jankélévitch (1903-1985), philosopher, musicologist.
 Mohammad Ali Mojtahedi (1908-), Iranian university professor and lifetime principal of the Alborz High School in Tehran.
 Faustin-Archange Touadéra (1957-), professor of mathematics, rector of the University of Bangui and Prime Minister of the Central African Republic.
 See also Notable alumni and faculty from Université Lille Nord de France

See also 

 École Centrale de Lille
 École nationale supérieure de chimie de Lille
 ESDP-Network
 European Doctoral College Lille Nord-Pas de Calais
 Institut d'électronique de microélectronique et de nanotechnologie (IEMN)
 Institut d'électronique de microélectronique et de nanotechnologie
 Institut des molécules et de la matière condensée de Lille
 Laboratoire d'Informatique Fondamentale de Lille
 Laboratoire d'Automatique, Génie Informatique et Signal
 Laboratoire de mécanique de Lille
 Laboratoire d'électrotechnique et d'électronique de puissance de Lille
 TELECOM Lille 1
 Utrecht Network

References

External links
 Université Lille 1 website
 Territoire en mouvement, academic journal est. 2006; successor to journal 

Educational institutions established in 1854
1854 establishments in France
Universities and colleges in Lille
Educational institutions disestablished in 2018
2018 disestablishments in France